Seema Upadhayay   is an Indian politician, belonging from the Bharatiya Janata Party. In the 2009 election she was elected to the Lok Sabha from Fatehpur Sikri constituency in Uttar Pradesh.

References

External links
  Official biographical sketch in Parliament of India website

India MPs 2009–2014
1965 births
Living people
Lok Sabha members from Uttar Pradesh
Bahujan Samaj Party politicians from Uttar Pradesh
Candidates in the 2014 Indian general election
Women in Uttar Pradesh politics
21st-century Indian women politicians
21st-century Indian politicians
Politicians from Meerut
People from Agra district